Epacris crassifolia  is a species of flowering plant in the heath family Ericaceae and is endemic to south-eastern New South Wales, Australia. It is a low-lying shrub with elliptic to egg-shaped leaves with the lower end towards the base, and tube-shaped, white or cream-coloured flowers clustered near the ends of the branches.

Description

Taxonomy
Epacris crassifolia was first formally described in 1810 by Robert Brown in his Prodromus Florae Novae Hollandiae et Insulae Van Diemen. The specific epithet (crassifolia) means "thick-leaved".

In 1996, R.K. Crowden and Yvonne Menadue described two subspecies of E. crassifolia and the names are accepted by the Australian Plant Census:

Distribution and habitat
This epacris grows on sandstone rock ledges and in rock crevices on the Central and South Coasts of New South Wales and inland as far as the Blue Mountains.

References

crassifolia
Ericales of Australia
Flora of New South Wales
Plants described in 1810
Taxa named by Robert Brown (botanist, born 1773)